Roy Wilson Follett (March 21, 1887 – January 7, 1963) was an American writer known for writing the draft form of what became Follett's Modern American Usage, which was unfinished at his death and was completed and edited by his friend Jacques Barzun (in collaboration with six other people who helped with the editing) and published posthumously.

He was educated at Harvard and taught at Brown University. In 1921, he was one of the dedicatees of James Branch Cabell's novel Figures of Earth. He also edited The Work of Stephen Crane in twelve volumes (1925–27), the first collected edition of Crane's writings. His novel No More Sea came in third in the voting for the 1934 Pulitzer Prize for fiction. He was the father of Barbara Newhall Follett, a child-prodigy author who disappeared in 1939 at the age of 25. He abandoned his wife and Barbara in the 1920s for a younger woman.

References

1887 births
1963 deaths
Writers of style guides
Brown University faculty
Harvard University alumni
20th-century American male writers